Bowling in Paris is an album by singer/songwriter Stephen Bishop, released by Atlantic Records in 1989. It was his first studio album released in America since 1980's Red Cab to Manhattan. Eric Clapton, Phil Collins, and Sting contributed to the album.

The album includes a re-recorded version of "Walking on Air", the original of which had appeared in the 1986 film The Boy Who Could Fly. The updated version, featuring Collins on drums and additional vocals, cracked the top 20 on the U.S. Adult Contemporary chart.

Critical reception

The Edmonton Journal labeled the album "a morass of syrupy, wimpy love songs."

Track listing
All songs written by Stephen Bishop, except where noted.

Personnel

Production 
 Producers – Michael Omartian (Tracks 1, 2, 3, 5, 7, 8, 10 & 11); Phil Collins (Tracks 4, 6, 9 & 11); Gus Dudgeon (Track 4); Hugh Padgham (Tracks 4, 6 & 9); Nick Launay (Track 11).
 Engineers – David Ahlert, Charles Barrett, Sid Barrett, Kevin Becka, Tchad Blake, Doug Carlton, Terry Christian, Graham Dickson, Steve Jackson, Nick Launay, David Leonard and Hugh Padgham.
 Studios – Lighthouse Recorders (Los Angeles, CA); The Sound Factory (Hollywood, CA); The Farm (Surrey, England); Maison Rogue, Homeland Studio and Elephant Studios (London, UK); AIR Studios (Montserrat).
 Mastered by Steve Hall at Future Disc (North Hollywood, CA).
 Photography – Chris Cuffaro
 Liner Notes – Phil Collins

References

Stephen Bishop (singer) albums
1989 albums
Atlantic Records albums
Albums produced by Phil Collins
Albums produced by Gus Dudgeon
Albums produced by Nick Launay
Albums produced by Michael Omartian
Albums produced by Hugh Padgham